Valerie Rebecca Mahfood (born February 1, 1974) is a female boxer who is a former world Super Middleweight and Light Heavyweight champion. 
Known as "The Big Bad Wolfe", Mahfood is known in the boxing world by her brawling style of fighting, and by her traditional trademark purple mohawk. She now resides in Groves, Texas (Beaumont area)

Career
Mahfood began boxing professionally July 27, 1997, knocking out Jeanne Martinez in the first round, in Baton Rouge, Louisiana. On April 23, 1998, she beat Brenda Cooper by a four round decision in Houston, marking her Texas debut.

She lost two of her next three fights, but she rebounded to win five fights in a row, which earned her first title try: on September 17, 1999, she knocked out Kathy Rivers in ten rounds at Panama City, Panama, to conquer the WIBF's world Light Heavyweight title. This was also her first fight abroad.

She won three non-title bouts after that, and then, on August 10, 2000, she went down in weight to the Super Middleweight division, to fight Mary Ann Almager for the vacant IWBF title. She won her second title, with a fifth round knockout of Almager in Houston. On her next fight, she became the first boxer to defeat Ann Wolfe, knocking her out in three rounds. And till this day it stands as Ann Wolfe's only career loss.

On November 16, 2001, she won the WIBA title by outpointing Trina Ortegon over ten rounds at Austin, and, shortly after, she beat Almager again, by an eight round split decision.

Mahfood and Laila Ali met in a long-awaited bout on November 8, 2002 in Las Vegas, Nevada, It was ESPN 2 Friday night fights series most view telecast and it was the first time a female world title fight was the main event on ESPN. A bloodied Mahfood was stopped by Ali in eight rounds, in a fight that unified the IWBF and WIBA world titles. On June 21, 2003, Mahfood and Ali had a rematch, this time in Los Angeles Staple Center on the undercard of the Lennox Lewis vs Vitali Klitschko World heavyweight Title. Mahfood lost by TKO in six while trying to recover her world title. Ali, however, suffered a serious cut (to her right eyelid) for the first (and to date, only) time in her boxing career (along with a bloodied nose). Ali retains a permanent scar from the encounter.

She won four of her next six fights, the lone loss in that span being a unanimous decision in a rematch against Wolfe. She also had a draw (tie) against Kathy Rivers, in a rematch of their Panama bout which Mahfood had won.

On September 24, 2004, Mahfood, sporting her traditional trademark purple Mohawk hairstyle, was dropped twice in the final seconds as she dropped a ten round unanimous decision to Leatitia Robinson in Atlanta, Georgia.

On November 6, 2004, Mahfood TKOd Yolanda Swindell in the second round.

Mahfood then went to Germany, and lost a 10 round unanimous decision to Natasha Ragosina.

On August 20, 2005, Mahfood fought Ann Wolfe, losing a ten round decision to Wolfe. In 2007 Mahfood fought Mary Jo Sanders for a world title.

Mahfood has a record of 19 wins, 14 losses and 1 draw, with nine knockout wins.

Professional boxing record

References

External links
 
Womenboxing.com bio

1974 births
Living people
American women boxers
Sportspeople from Beaumont, Texas
Boxers from Texas
World boxing champions
Middleweight boxers
21st-century American women